Roger Law (born 6 September 1941, in Littleport, Cambridgeshire), is a British caricaturist, ceramist and one half of Luck and Flaw (with Peter Fluck), creators of the popular satirical TV puppet show Spitting Image. Roger Law was a pioneer in bringing political caricatures from newspapers and magazines to television. In 2020 Roger Law was executive producer on the new series of Spitting Image made with Avalon Productions and streamed on Britbox.

Early life and education
Law went to Littleport Secondary Modern School in Littleport, Cambridgeshire, and attended Cambridge School of Art (now part of Anglia Ruskin University). He met Peter Fluck during his time there.

Career

Early work 
In 1960 whilst Roger was at Cambridge School of Art he was made art director of the university magazine, Granta. That same year, Roger was also published by East Anglian Magazine.  After graduating from Cambridge School of Art, Law started his career working in print, namely magazines. By 1963, Law was creating a weekly cartoon with Peter Cook for The Observer, a short-lived venture aptly named ‘Almost the end’. At the same time, Law was also doing a 14 ft long weekly cartoon strip for The Establishment Club, a nightclub opened by Peter Cook in Soho. The Establishment Club has since been named as a pivotal meeting spot for the British satirical movement in the 1960s.

In 1966 Law worked as a freelance caricaturist and illustrator for The Sunday Times. During this time he made his first 3D caricature model for Nova Magazine which won a D&AD silver award. That same year Law also worked on album covers for The Who, The Who Sell Out and Jimi Hendrix's Axis Bold as Love. Law is also said to have made a brief appearance in The Who's music video for "Happy Jack".

In 1967 Law moved to the United States and took up residence at Reed College, Portland. Whilst in the US Law worked on his first film featuring puppets, called The Milkman. The Milkman dystopian-satirical look at American capitalism and the technology that surrounded it. The film was awarded Rockefeller grant. Law also freelanced for Esquire and Newsweek. 

After a brief stint working in New York at Push Pin Studios with Milton Glaser and Seymour Chwast, Law returned to the UK in 1969 to be a features editor at The Sunday Times Magazine. When Rupert Murdoch bought The Times and The Sunday Times in 1975, Law left the magazine and formed a partnership with Peter Fluck, a group which became Luck & Flaw. Together they made 3D caricature models for magazine covers worldwide, including The New York Times Magazine, Der Spiegel, Stern and The Economist & Radio Times. The pair also did visual satire over several pages for the National Lampoon. The piece on the common market was sold to every European country. In 1979 Luck & Flaw illustrated Charles Dickens's A Christmas Carol, published by Viking.

Law and Fluck also created caricature ceramics, featuring British politicians including Margaret Thatcher and members of the British royal family. In 1980 the BBC's Arena made an arts documentary on Luck and Flaw called The Luck and Flaw Show.

Spitting Image 
In 1981 Law and Fluck made a plan to transfer political caricatures to television, which was funded by Martin Lambie-Nairn. Two years later the pilot for Spitting Image was shot. On 26 February 1984, the first episode of Spitting Image was transmitted on ITV for Central Independent Television. This was the first series of 18. In 1985 Spitting Image created puppets for two shows called ‘Michael Nesmith’s Television Parts’ for NBC Network TV, USA. In 1986, Treasure Island by Robert Louis Stevenson, illustrated by the pair, was published by Faber & Faber.

Arena made another two specials about Spitting Image, The Spitting Image Factory, where Law and Fluck toured the workshop where the show was produced. Also in 1985, they made another documentary with Arena called Luck and Flaw's Guide to Caricature.

In 1986 a song by Spitting Image, "The Chicken Song" topped the UK hit parade for three weeks. Under Law's creative eye the Spitting Image workshop produced merchandise alongside the show, notably rubber dog chews called 'Pet Hates with the slogan ‘Throw a politician to your dog’. Spitting Image also released many popular books, such as The Appallingly Disrespectful Spitting Image Book and The Spitting Image Giant Komic Book. The Spitting Image workshop also created the puppets for the music video "Land of Confusion" by Genesis. The same year, Spitting Image published a book titled Tooth and Claw: Inside Story of "Spitting Image". This book gave an insight into working at the Spitting Image workshop and was mainly visual. In 1990 Spitting Image brought out ‘The Real Maggie Memoirs’ and Law published his first book, ‘A Nasty Piece of Work’, written in collaboration with Lewis Chester.

The Alliance Graphic International (AGI) elected Law as a member in 1993.

By 1994 Spitting Image had been franchised in countries such as Japan, Czech Republic, Portugal, Greece, Hungary, Germany and Russia. That same year Law worked on a new puppet TV film Peter and the Wolf: A Prokofiev Fantasy. It was the musical tale of Peter and the Wolf brought to life by puppets and human characters in a fairy tale world. The film was narrated by Sting and conducted by Claudio Abbado. Peter and the Wolf was the first-ever international co-production. In 1995 Law and Spitting Image funded a short animated film called The Big Story made by David Stoten and Timothy Watts, which was then nominated for an Academy Award (Oscar) and a BAFTA award.

The last series of Spitting Image was aired in 1996. The first online sale of the Spitting Image puppets was organised in 2000 by Kerry Taylor of Sotheby’s. The second sale was just a year later and hosted at Olympia. In 2018 Cambridge University Library accepted the Spitting Image Archive.

In September 2019 Spitting Image was confirmed to be returning twenty-three years after it was last aired. Avalon Productions produced the ten shows with Roger's as Exec Producer alongside Jeff Westbrook, Richard Allen-Turner, Joanna Beresford, and Jon Thoday. The first show was premiered on Britbox in the UK in the Autumn of 2020. The shows were also aired globally on separate platforms. Avalon has confirmed another ten shows to be aired in 2021. 

The second series of Spitting Image aired in 2021, with Law being credited as executive producer.

 Later career 
From 1996 to 1997 Crapston Villas, which was produced in the Spitting Image workshop and studio, was aired. It was a stop-motion animation featuring a set of characters, living in a grim apartment building in the fictional London postcode of SE69, who were plagued by various dilemmas.

Roger then moved to Australia as an artist in residence at the National Art School in Sydney. That same year he was made a fellow of the International Specialised Skills Foundation in Australia. In 1999 Roger was made a member of The Faculty of Royal Designers for Industry (RDI).

In 2000 Roger was an artist in residence at Dartington pottery in Devon, UK. Roger also had three exhibitions Risk Takers and Pioneers,  Aussie Stuff-Way Beyond the Black Stump and The Royal Academy of Arts Summer Exhibition 2000. In that same year Roger was also presented an award from the University of Leicester's Political Studies Association on their 50th Anniversary 1950 – 2000

In 2005 Roger's second book, a semi-autobiography, Still Spitting at Sixty was published by Harper Collins with chapters on his Australian travels. Law also worked in Jingdezhen, China producing large carved ceramics. The Sladmore Gallery in London now sells Law's ceramics. Law then moved back to the UK in 2012.

Inspiration

Whilst Roger was at Art school Paul Hogarth, one of his tutors, showed him the French magazine, L’Assiette au Buerre. Roger has stated many times that the drawings and attitudes of the magazine were a great inspiration. L’assiette au Buerre was illustrated front to back with cartoons or caricatures with only a short satirical caption written at the bottom of each page. The magazine challenged social norms and commented on problems of the period but had no clear political alliance.

During Roger's early career whilst working closely with Peter Cook at The Observer and The Establishment Club he met many satirists including Lenny Bruce, such meetings gave him his first steps to use his drawing skills for satire. He quotes

“Only those who attempt the absurd are capable of achieving the impossible.”

Roger has always cited that the ‘family friendly’ puppet show Punch and Judy was a great inspiration when working on Spitting Image, they both pushed boundaries. The idea that you can have extreme violence, murder, and infanticide yet is still funny and even enjoyed by children was, retrospectively, his first step in creating the grotesque Spitting Image style.  

Roger has stated that his mentor was Paul Hogarth was a huge inspiration. Hogarth was an English artist and illustrator. Best known for his travel drawings that he made for Graham Greene's books, Robert Graves books and the Irish playwright Brendan Bingham.

The Fen's where Roger Law was born was outlaw territory until comparatively recently and anti-establishment attitudes still linger on. Roger feels growing up around people who had less of a desire to follow the rules gave him licence to break them throughout his career.

Personal life
He married Deidre Amsden (a quilt designer) in 1960 in Cambridge. They have a son (born 1962) and daughter (born 1965).

 Television Spitting Image Spitting Image Specials'

Film

Radio

Books

Exhibitions

Awards and nominations

Music awards

Film

Design awards

References

External links
 threehumansinc.com/RogerLaw.html
 www.rogerlawceramics.com
 Biography
 Lambiek Comiclopedia article.
 The Times March 2005
 Whatever happened to the teapots?
https://www.bbc.co.uk/programmes/p01wdwz6
https://www.sladmorecontemporary.com/roger-law-biography
https://www.theguardian.com/artanddesign/2014/aug/03/roger-law-spitting-image-potter
https://www.theatlantic.com/entertainment/archive/2011/10/roger-laws-odyssey-from-satire-on-tv-to-chinas-porcelain-city/246176/
https://www.fendittongallery.com/roger-law
https://scottish-gallery.co.uk/artist/roger-law
https://www.discogs.com/artist/1669813-Roger-Law
https://www.sainsburycentre.ac.uk/stories/roger-law-spitting-image/
https://www.theoldie.co.uk/article/john-lloyd-oldie-puppeteer-of-the-year-roger-law
https://www.bbc.co.uk/programmes/p029yrf3/p029yz20
https://www.bbc.co.uk/programmes/b06v5xhx/episodes/guide
https://www.bbc.co.uk/programmes/b091tv95
https://www.bbc.co.uk/programmes/b06v5xhx/episodes/guide
https://www.bbc.co.uk/programmes/b012r99b
https://www.bbc.co.uk/programmes/b049pcvt/episodes/guide
https://www.bbc.co.uk/programmes/b04nql09
https://www.bbc.co.uk/programmes/b049pcvt/episodes/guide
https://www.bbc.co.uk/programmes/p009mlw9
https://www.bbc.co.uk/programmes/b04nv6lv
https://www.bbc.co.uk/programmes/p01s1y7j
https://www.bbc.co.uk/programmes/b016k6xl
https://www.bbc.co.uk/programmes/p01sn8c7
https://www.bbc.co.uk/programmes/b00pg5pn
https://www.bbc.co.uk/programmes/b01rkxht
https://www.bbc.co.uk/programmes/b008tx8m
https://www.bbc.co.uk/programmes/p06rqtjc
https://www.bbc.co.uk/programmes/b00knwyq
https://www.bbc.co.uk/programmes/b00nt9c5
https://www.bbc.co.uk/programmes/p01sg4d4
https://www.bbc.co.uk/programmes/b0383j0r
https://www.bbc.co.uk/programmes/b008wf02/episodes/guide
https://www.bbc.co.uk/programmes/b00s7vs4
https://www.bbc.co.uk/programmes/b00wldd9
https://www.bbc.co.uk/programmes/b00c9n3p
https://www.bbc.co.uk/programmes/b00rd967/episodes/guide
https://www.bbc.co.uk/programmes/b01pj1l7
https://www.bbc.co.uk/programmes/b00sdrtm
https://www.bbc.co.uk/programmes/b03vzwfn
https://www.bbc.co.uk/programmes/b00k718c

1941 births
Living people
Alumni of Anglia Ruskin University
British caricaturists
British comics artists
British illustrators
British satirists
British ceramicists
Album-cover and concert-poster artists
Courtroom sketch artists
People from Ely, Cambridgeshire
Spitting Image
English expatriates in Australia